The Goops books, originally published between 1900 and 1950, were created by the artist, art critic, poet, author and humorist Gelett Burgess. The characters debuted, conceptually, in the illustrations of Burgess' publication The Lark, in the late 19th century. The Goops also appeared in panels in the popular monthly children's publication St. Nicholas, as early as 1898. The Goops series is among his most famous works.

The Goops, they lick their fingers,
and the Goops, they lick their knives;
They spill their broth on the tablecloth,
Oh, they lead disgusting lives!

Since the publication of the original Goops book, Goops and How to Be Them, in 1900, the series has come to be seen as the quintessential series on teaching children the importance of manners and polite behavior.

When you are playing with the girls,
you must not pull their pretty curls;
if you are gentle when you play,
you will be glad of it some day!

Though widely circulated during the height of Burgess' popularity, some of the Goops books have become difficult to find. Goops and How to Be Them and More Goops and How Not to Be Them are still widely available. Out-of-print titles such as Goops Encyclopedia and Blue Goops and Red may be found in rare book rooms and antiquarian bookstores.

In addition to the books, Burgess created the syndicated comic strip Goops in 1924 and worked on it through its end in 1925.

Elizabeth Metz Butterfield of Jamestown, N.Y. set a number of Burgess' Goop poems to music.  They were published under the name The Goop Songbook.

Books

Goops and How to Be Them (1900) Juvenile
More Goops and How Not to Be Them (1903) Juvenile
Goop Tales (1904) Juvenile 
Blue Goops and Red (1909) Juvenile
The Goop Directory of Juvenile Offenders (1913) Juvenile
Why Be a Goop? (1924) Juvenile
New Goops and How to Know Them (1951) Juvenile

References

Strickler, Dave. Syndicated Comic Strips and Artists, 1924-1995: The Complete Index. Cambria, California: Comics Access, 1995. .

External links
Publisher of Goops books
Gelett Burgess Center for Creative Expression
Toonopedia: Gelett Burgess
 
U of Toronto Representative Poetry Online: Gelett Burgess
 
YouTube videos of Goops

1900 books
1924 comics debuts
1925 comics endings
American comics characters
Educational comics
Fictional families
Comics about married people